The 932d Air Control Squadron is an inactive United States Air Force unit. It was last assigned to the 85th Group, Third Air Force, stationed at Keflavik Air Station, Iceland. It was inactivated on 27 June 2006.

From 1952 to 2006, the unit was a General Surveillance Radar Squadron providing for the air defense of Iceland and the North Atlantic.

History

Lineage

 Constituted as 932d Aircraft Control and Warning Squadron on 28 Apr 1952
 Activated on 1 May 1952
 Redesignated 932d Air Defense Squadron  on 1 Oct 1987
 Redesignated 932d Air Control Squadron on 31 May 1993
 Inactivated on 27 June 2006

Assignments
 Ninth Air Force, 1 May 1952
 65th Air Division (Defense), 1 Oct 1952
 Iceland Air Defense Force, 8 Mar 1954
 1400th Operations Group, 18 Dec 1955
 Air Forces Iceland, 1 July 1960
 35th Operations Group, 31 May 1993
 85th Operations Group, 1 Oct 1994
 85th Group, 1 July 1995 – 28 June 2006

Stations
 Otis Air Force Base, Falmouth, Massachusetts, 1 May 1952
 Keflavik Airport, Iceland, 1 Oct 1952
 Rockville Air Station, Iceland, 1 Aug 1957 
 Keflavik Air Station, Iceland, Oct 1997 - 28 June 2006

Past commanders

Cpt Thomas H. Galligan, 1 May 1952
LTC Ruel M. Luckingham, 26 Jun 1952
LTC Allie P. Ash, Jul 1953
LTC John C. Peck, Jul 1954
LTC Jim R. Tebbs, Jul 1955
LTC Edwin L. Murrill, 1 Jul 1956
Maj J. Bert Davis, Jul 1957
Maj George T. Milonas, Jul 1958
Maj Guy B. Hume, 1 Dec 1958
Maj Charles F. Carter, 28 Oct 1959
Maj Austin W. Simmons, 28 Jul 1960
Maj Jack C. Shadeck, Sep 1962
LTC William H. Truxal, Sep 1963
Cpt Arthur C. Mussman, Jun 1965 (Acting)
LTC Victor J. Carlino, 1965
LTC Frank J. Pietyka, Aug 1965
Maj Victor J. Carlino, Jul 1968
LTC Frank J. Pietryka, 24 Jul 1968
LTC James H. Wallace, Jul 1970
LTC John J. Bayer, Jul 1972
LTC Richard M. Overland, Jun 1973
LTC James G. Young, 7 Jul 1975
LTC Johnnie S. Toniolli, 6 Jul 1977
LTC L. Keith Demott, Jul 1979
LTC Edward Boardman, 17 Jul 1981
LTC Forrest N. Freeman Jr, Jul 1982
LTC George H. Gwinn, 8 Jul 1983
LTC Waller D. Wieters, 5 Jul 1984
LTC Ronald L. Gavette, 5 Jul 1985
LTC Dennis W. Shepard, Aug 1986
LTC Terry L. Troy, 7 Aug 1987
LTC Billy A. Wooley, 7 Aug 1989
LTC Lynn R. Wills, 22 Jul 1991
LTC Clark P. Wigley, 23 Jul 1993
LTC Ray T. Garza, 7 Jul 1995
LTC Rex A. Marshall, 31 Jul 1997
LTC William A. Schaake, 26 Mar 1999
LTC Van Don Kepley, 6 Jul 2001

References

 .

Radar squadrons of the United States Air Force